In graph theory, Schnyder's theorem is a characterization of planar graphs in terms
of the order dimension of their incidence posets. It is named after Walter Schnyder, who published its proof in 1989.

The incidence poset  of an undirected graph  with vertex set  and edge set  is the partially ordered set of height 2 that has  as its elements.

The order dimension of a partial order is the smallest number of total orderings whose intersection is the given partial order; such a set of orderings is called a realizer of the partial order.

Extensions 
However, this result cannot be generalized to higher-dimensional convex polytopes, as there exist four-dimensional polytopes whose face lattices have unbounded order dimension.

Even more generally, for abstract simplicial complexes, the order dimension of the face poset of the complex is at most , where  is the minimum dimension of a Euclidean space in which the complex has a geometric realization .

Other graphs
As Schnyder observes, the incidence poset of a graph G has order dimension two if and only if the graph is a path or a subgraph of a path. For, in when an incidence poset has order dimension is two, its only possible realizer consists of two total orders that (when restricted to the graph's vertices) are the reverse of each other. Any other two orders would have an intersection that includes an order relation between two vertices, which is not allowed for incidence posets. For these two orders on the vertices, an edge between consecutive vertices can be included in the ordering by placing it immediately following the later of the two edge endpoints, but no other edges can be included.

If a graph can be colored with four colors, then its incidence poset has order dimension at most four .

The incidence poset of a complete graph on n vertices has order dimension  .

References 
.
.
.
.
.
.

Order theory
Planar graphs
Theorems in graph theory